WJDK-FM (95.7 FM) is a radio station broadcasting a country music format. Licensed to Seneca, Illinois, the station serves Grundy County and Eastern LaSalle County, and is owned by Nelson Multimedia Inc. The station began broadcasting in 1998.

On May 1, 2022, WJDK-FM changed their format from adult contemporary to country, branded as "K-Country 95.7".

References

External links
WJDK's website

JDK
Country radio stations in the United States
Radio stations established in 1998
1998 establishments in Illinois